The Most Hon. Henry Francis Seymour Moore, 3rd Marquess of Drogheda, KP, PC (I) (14 August 1825 – 29 June 1892), was an Irish peer, styled Viscount Moore until 1837.

He was the only son of Lord Henry Seymour Moore, a younger son of  Field Marshal The 1st Marquess of Drogheda, and The Hon. Mary Parnell, daughter of The 1st Baron Congleton, who was a great uncle of the Irish nationalist leader Charles Stewart Parnell. His father died a few days after his birth in August 1825. His mother remarried Edward Cole of Twickenham, a grandson of The 12th Earl of Derby, by whom she had two more children.

He became Marquess of Drogheda in 1837 on the death of his uncle, The 2nd Marquess of Drogheda. He was appointed a Knight of the Order of St Patrick on 7 February 1868. He served as Lord Lieutenant of Kildare  from 1874 until his death. He married The Hon. Mary Stuart-Wortley, daughter of The 2nd Baron Wharncliffe and his wife, Lady Elizabeth Ryder, in 1847.

His uncle Charles, the second Marquess, had been insane for many years when he died. However, there is no evidence that Henry was similarly afflicted, although his maternal grandfather Lord Congleton committed suicide in 1842 after battling ill health and depression.

Lord Drogheda had no children and on his death the Marquessate became extinct; the title Earl of Drogheda passed to a cousin, Ponsonby Moore.

References

External links 

|-

1837 births
1892 deaths
Knights of St Patrick
19th-century Irish people
Lord-Lieutenants of Kildare
Members of the Privy Council of Ireland
Marquesses of Drogheda